Etoile Sportive Berrouaghia, known as ES Berrouaghia or simply ESB for short, is an Algerian football club based in Berrouaghia in Médéa Province. The club was founded in 1923 and its colours are green and white. Their home stadium, Stade Fergani Guernina, has a capacity of 5,000 spectators. The club is currently playing in the Inter-Régions Division.

History

By season
{|class="wikitable"
|-bgcolor="#efefef"
! Season
! Division
! Pos.
! G
! W
! D
! L
! GS
! GA
! P
!Cup
!Notes
|-
|2009–10
|Régional I
| 4
|align=right|30 ||align=right|20 ||align=right|6 ||align=right|4
|align=right|49 ||align=right|15 ||align=right|66
||
|
|-
|2010–11
|Inter-Régions
| 10
|align=right|29 ||align=right|12 ||align=right|4 ||align=right|13
|align=right|32 ||align=right|32 ||align=right|40
||
|
|-
|2011–12
|Inter-Régions
|align=right bgcolor=#DDFFDD| 1
|align=right|-||align=right|-||align=right|-||align=right|-
|align=right|-||align=right|-||align=right|-
||
|
|-
|2012–13
|LNF Amateur
|6
|align=right|26 ||align=right|9 ||align=right|7 ||align=right|10
|align=right|31 ||align=right|34 ||align=right|34
||
|
|-
|2013–14
|LNF Amateur
|11
|align=right|30 ||align=right|10 ||align=right|6 ||align=right|14
|align=right|25 ||align=right|30 ||align=right|35
||
|
|-
|2014–15
|LNF Amateur
|
|align=right| ||align=right| ||align=right| ||align=right| 
|align=right| ||align=right| ||align=right| 
||
|
|}

References

External links

Football clubs in Algeria
Médéa Province
Association football clubs established in 1923
1923 establishments in Algeria
Sports clubs in Algeria